Kadakkad is a Municipal division in Pandalam. Situated in the banks of Achankovil river; Kadakkad divided into two provinces, Kadakkad North and Kadakkad South. Pandalam-Pathanamthitta road is passing through here and Kadakkad-Kaipattoor road proposed to be upgraded to NH standards.

Etymology
The name Kadakkad derived from Kharan (An Asura inhabited this place) and Kadu (Forest).

Places of Worship
Kadakkad Sree Bhadrakali Temple
Kadakkad Juma Masjid

Institutions
 Sugarcane Seed Farm, Kadakkad.
 District Soil Testing Laboratory, Kadakkad.

Gallery

References 

Villages in Pathanamthitta district